This is a list of Iranian football transfers for the 2019–20 winter transfer window. Only transfers involving a team from the professional divisions are listed, including the 16 teams in the 2019–20 Persian Gulf Pro League and the 18 teams playing in the 2019–20 Azadegan League.

The winter transfer window opens on 17 December  2019, although a few transfers may take place prior to that date. The window closes at midnight on 13 January 2020 although outgoing transfers might still happen to leagues in which the window is still open. Players without a club may join teams, either during or in between transfer windows.

Iran Pro League

Esteghlal 

In:

Out:

Foolad 

In:

Out:

Gol Gohar 

In:

Out:

Machine Sazi 

In:

Out:

Naft Masjed-Soleyman 

In:

Out:

Nassaji 

In:

Out:

Pars Jonoubi Jam 

In:

Out:

Paykan 

In:

Out:

Persepolis 

In:

Out:

Saipa 

In:

Out:

Sanat Naft 

In:

Out:

Shahin Bushehr 

In:

Out:

Shahr Khodro 

In:

Out:

Sepahan 

In:

Out:

Tractor 

In:

Out:

Zob Ahan 

In:

Out:

Notes and references

Football transfers winter 2019–20
2019–20
Transfers